Niyoga was an ancient Hindu practice, primarily followed during the ancient period. It permitted either the husband or the wife who had no child by their spouse to procreate a child with another man or a woman.

Literature

Mahabharata 
The epic Mahabharata describes one instance of niyoga. Queen Satyavati asks her eldest son, sage Vyasa to perform niyoga with both the widows of her younger son Vichitravirya. The widows, sisters Ambika and Ambalika and one of their maids, Parishrami bear Dhritarashtra, Pandu and Vidura, respectively.

The practise is also mentioned in the story of Sage Dirghatamas.

Manusmṛti 
In the Manusmṛti, niyoga is described in IX.59-63, but the practice is also allowed in IX.64-68. This text (IX.167) describes the child born by niyoga as a kshetraja child of the husband-wife.

Historical examples 

The Haihaya (Kalachuri) ruler Raja Raj Singh (c. 1689-1712) begot a son through niyoga on the advice of his Brahmin councilors.

In popular culture
Niyoga is the central issue of Anahat, a Marathi feature film directed by Amol Palekar. It was showcased at the International Film Festival of India 2003.

The movie Eklavya: The Royal Guard has this practice as the central plot. The title character played by Amitabh Bachchan is torn between his duty and the emotions for his children begotten by the practice of niyoga.

It is also portrayed in the 1989 film Oonch Neech Beech, where the character played by Kulbhushan Kharbanda, a sanyasi, is commanded by his teacher to perform niyoga.

References

External links
 Women in Indian scriptures

Marriage in Hinduism
Customs involving siblings